Arnold Karl Georg von Kameke (14 April 1817, in Pasewalk – 12 October 1893, in Berlin) was a Prussian General of the Infantry and Minister of War.

Life 
Arnold Karl Georg von Kameke was a son of Prussian army officer Georg Christian Friedrich von Kameke.

Kameke began his military career in the Prussian Army in 1834 by enlisting in the 2nd Engineer Battalion in Stettin. In 1836 he became an officer in the corps of engineers and in 1850 was assigned to the General Staff, after being promoted to Captain. In 1861 he was made a Colonel and in 1863 Chief of Staff of the VIII Corps. In 1865 he became a Major General and a short while later became Chief of Staff of the II Corps.

He participated in the Austro-Prussian War as Chief of Staff of the II Corps, which was part of the First Army. Kameke was awarded the Pour le Mérite for his services in the war. In 1867 he was made head of the entire corps of engineers, and in 1868 he was made a Lieutenant General.

In the Franco-Prussian War Kameke commanded the 14th Division and fought in the Battle of Spicheren, the Battle of Borny-Colombey and the Battle of Gravelotte. After the surrender of the fortress of Metz he conquered Thionville, Montmédy and besieged Mézières. But before Méziéres fell he was called to Versailles on 23 December 1870 to lead the engineers' attack against Paris. For his actions, Kameke received the oak leaves to the Pour le Mérite. From 18 February 1871 onwards he again headedthe corps of engineers and also served as Inspector General of Fortresses.

On 9 September 1873, after having acted on the post since the turn of the year, Kameke succeeded Albrecht von Roon as Minister of War. On 22 March 1875 he was appointed General of the Infantry. On 3 March 1883 he retired from his posts and withdrew to his property, Hohenfelde near Kolberg in Pomerania.

Honours 
He received the following orders and decorations:

References

1817 births
1893 deaths
Independent politicians in Germany
People from Pasewalk
People from the Province of Pomerania
Generals of Infantry (Prussia)
Recipients of the Pour le Mérite (military class)
Recipients of the Iron Cross (1870), 1st class
Grand Officiers of the Légion d'honneur
Commanders of the Military Order of Max Joseph
Grand Cordons of the Order of the Rising Sun
Recipients of the Order of the White Eagle (Russia)
Recipients of the Order of St. Anna, 1st class
Grand Crosses of the Order of Aviz
Military personnel from Mecklenburg-Western Pomerania